Paskal is a male given name.

Paskal may also refer to:
 Cleo Paskal, a geopolitics academic
 PASKAL, a special operations force of Malaysia
 PASKAL: The Movie, a 2018 Malaysian action film

See also
 Pascal (disambiguation)
 Pascall (disambiguation)
 Paschal (disambiguation)
 Pascual (disambiguation)
 Pasqual (disambiguation)
 Pasquale (disambiguation)